Rühn is a municipality in Mecklenburg-Vorpommern, Germany.

Ruhn may also refer to:

Melita Ruhn (born 1965), Romanian artistic gymnast
Ruhn Hills, Germany